Tehuacán Airport  is an airport serving Tehuacán, a city in the state of Puebla in Mexico. It is also known as Tehuacán National Airport (Aeropuerto Nacional de Tehuacán).

In 2021, the airport handled 2,176 passengers, and in 2022 it handled 2,156 passengers.

Facilities

Statistics

Passengers

See also 

List of the busiest airports in Mexico

References

External links
 Tehuacán Airport

Airports in Puebla